Ken Kimmelman is an American filmmaker, animator, and Aesthetic Realism consultant. He is the president of Imagery Film, Ltd. and is known for his films opposing racism and prejudice, including The Heart Knows Better, a public service film for which he received a National Emmy Award and Brushstrokes, produced for the United Nations. Both films were inspired by Aesthetic Realism, the philosophy whose founder, Eli Siegel, identified contempt, "the addition to self through the lessening of something else" as the cause of racism and all human injustice. Kimmelman is also noted for his Poetry film, Hot Afternoons Have Been in Montana, based on the prize-winning poem by Eli Siegel. Historian Howard Zinn said of this film, "It matches, in its visual beauty, the elegance of Siegel's words, and adds the dimension of stunning imagery to an already profound work of art."

Kimmelman teaches "If It Moves, It Can Move You: Opposites in the Cinema" at the Aesthetic Realism Foundation where film excerpts are shown and discussed. "We study how such opposites as rest and motion, light and dark, continuity and discontinuity, unity and variety—opposites we are trying to make sense of in our lives—are present in the motion picture, from The Great Train Robbery of 1903 to the latest cinematic achievement."

Early life and career

Ken Kimmelman was born on August 6, 1940 in Crotona Park East Hospital in the Bronx to Bernard Kimmelman and Ida Moskowitz Kimmelman. He grew up in Washington Heights and attended the High School of Industrial Arts (now the High School of Art and Design). In 1958 he began his career in the animation studio of CBS Terrytoons in New Rochelle, NY, working on Mighty Mouse and other cartoons. He soon moved on to TV commercials (including animation for the classic Ajax "White Tornado" ad) and other freelance work.

From 1960 to the present he produced, designed and animated numerous films for the Sesame Workshop television shows Sesame Street, The Electric Company, and 3-2-1 Contact. From 1966-1970, he worked for NBC making promotional films and specials, including Frank Sinatra: A Man and His Music and the Jerry Lewis special. He worked on various TV series, including The Danny Thomas Show, I Spy, The Virginian, Hollywood Squares, The Monkees and Run for Your Life. He was the Director of Animation for the NBC special Damn Yankees. He made motion picture trailers for films, including The Dirty Dozen, From Russia with Love, The Godfather, Parts I & II, Serpico, The Great Gatsby, Star Trek, The Sting, Papillon, Conan the Destroyer, Mommie Dearest, Heaven's Gate, Cotton Club, Scarface, Body Heat, and more.

He designed and produced two short films shown as rear-screen projections representing the dreams and nightmares of the title character in the New York City Opera's production of Alberto Ginastera's Beatrix Cenci at Lincoln Center.

Aesthetic Realism

A pivotal point in Kimmelman's life and career was in 1966, when he began to study Aesthetic Realism with its founder, Eli Siegel, the American poet and philosopher who defined beauty and explained the relation between art and life. His statement, "All beauty is a making one of opposites, and the making one of opposites is what we are going after in ourselves" was illustrated in  Kimmelman's first educational film, People Are Trying to Put Opposites Together, a documentary of Siegel teaching an Aesthetic Realism class. It was shown on WNET-TV, Channel 13 in New York City in October, 1968 and again in September, 1969.

Over the years, Kimmelman has written in professional journals and spoken at film festivals about the profound impact Aesthetic Realism has had on his life and work in films. "I learned how to distinguish between true humor and contempt," he wrote. "When animation is successful, it gives form to contempt as a means of opposing it." He explained that art exposes pretense, hypocrisy and cruelty for the purpose of honoring beauty, good sense, respect for reality.

In his own films, Kimmelman uses humor and the beauty of art to tackle social and economic injustice. In 1989, he produced Asimbonanga, a film against apartheid funded by the United Nations. The following year, the UN commissioned Brushstrokes, an animated film against prejudice for people of all ages. The proviso was that it use no language because the film would be shown worldwide, and contain no color that might imply a particular ethnicity. Through an animated green brushstroke acting superior and disdainful of other colors and shapes, the film shows that racism is not only dishonest but ridiculous. Original jazz music and vocals by Major Holley and tap dance rhythms by Jimmy Slyde, bring life and personality to the animated brushstrokes on the screen. Audiences see contempt literally walking the floor, and also see it defeated, as the film concludes, by art, and by reality itself, as sameness and difference together, as one, make for the beauty of this world. Kimmelman uses this film to engage audiences of all ages in examining contempt, bullying, and racism in ourselves. "I think every film, no matter how difficult the subject," he said, "should make for more respect for the world."

Educator and activist
As an educator and activist, Kimmelman speaks about hunger and homelessness in America, the subject of his 1999 film, What Does a Person Deserve? and encourages audiences of all ages to examine where bullying and racism begin in the self. He has produced award-winning educational films for children, including Thomas Comma, the adventure of a lonely comma looking for the right sentence. He received an Emmy for his contributions to Sesame Street, was nominated twice as a director of the animated TV series Doug. He has directed various animated TV series, including Clifford’s Puppy Days, Daria and The Wild Thornberrys and he co-wrote, with Mick Carlon, the screenplay Riding on Duke's Train, an animated feature film about the great Duke Ellington, as seen through the eyes of a nine-year-old boy he befriends. It has won numerous screenplay awards in film festivals.

Kimmelman has taught film and animation at New York University and the School of Visual Arts. He is a consultant on the faculty of the Aesthetic Realism Foundation, where he teaches the film course "If It Moves, It Can Move You: Opposites in the Cinema." He is one of the instructors of "The Critical Inquiry: A Workshop in the Visual Arts" and presents public seminars on subjects including "The Mix-Up in Everyone about Coldness and Warmth" and "Is a Man's Cynicism Weakness or Strength?"

On the subject of ethics and aesthetics, Kimmelman has presented his Poetry film, Hot Afternoons Have Been in Montana at the Modern Language Association's 2011 annual conference in Los Angeles, and at the Manhattan School of Music as part of his lecture, "Aesthetic Realism and the Literary Cinema of Ken Kimmelman."

As an activist, Kimmelman has addressed audiences of all ages about the need to confront bullying and racism. He is a founding member of Housing: A Basic Human Right, and his film, What Does a Person Deserve? deals with homelessness and hunger in America. On this subject he was the keynote speaker for the Community Service Outreach Program at Boston University and spoke at various institutions including Harvard, Vassar, NYU, Pace, and Dickinson College. He spoke on Film—and 'The Art of Enjoying Justice'! at Stanford University, Baruch College, as part of the Human Rights Film Festival at Syracuse University, and also in Israel.

Filmography & screenplays

References

1940 births
Living people
People from the Bronx
Film directors from New York City
Aesthetic Realism
American animators
Emmy Award winners
High School of Art and Design alumni